Stagger or staggered may refer to:

Stagger (aeronautics), the horizontal positioning of a plane's wings 
Stagger, a motorsport term for the difference in size between right and left tires
Stagger (EP), by Poppy, 2022
Staggered (film), a 1994 British romantic comedy film
Staggered Board of Directors, a method of electing directors of a company or other organization 
Staggered conformation, a chemical conformation of an ethane-like moiety 
Staggered elections, a method of electing members of government
Staggered fermion, a model in quantum mechanics
Staggered junction, a place where roads meet a main road at a slight distance apart
Staggered Pin Grid Array, a style of arranging pins on an integrated circuit package
Staggered spinup, a method for preventing excessive power-consumption in computer disks
Staggered truss system, a type of structural steel framing used in high-rise buildings

See also
Stagger Lee (disambiguation)
Staggers (disambiguation)